Women's Hall of Fame may refer to:

Australian halls of fame

National Pioneer Women's Hall of Fame
Tasmanian Honour Roll of Women
Victorian Honour Roll of Women

Costa Rica 
 La Galería de las Mujeres de Costa Rica

Singapore halls of fame 
 Singapore Women's Hall of Fame

United States halls of fame
 National Women's Hall of Fame

By state 
Alabama Women's Hall of Fame
Alaska Women's Hall of Fame
Arizona Women's Hall of Fame
Arkansas Women's Hall of Fame
Colorado Women's Hall of Fame
Connecticut Women's Hall of Fame
Florida Women's Hall of Fame
Georgia Women of Achievement
Hall of Fame of Delaware Women
Iowa Women's Hall of Fame
Kentucky Women Remembered
Louisiana Center for Women and Government Hall of Fame
Maine Women's Hall of Fame
Maryland Women's Hall of Fame
Michigan Women's Hall of Fame
National Women's Hall of Fame
New Jersey Women's Hall of Fame
North Carolina Women's Hall of Fame
Ohio Women's Hall of Fame
Oklahoma Women's Hall of Fame
Rhode Island Heritage Hall of Fame Women Inductees
Tennessee Women's Hall of Fame
Texas Women's Hall of Fame

By locality 
 Chicago Women's Hall of Fame
 D.C. Women's Hall of Fame
 El Paso Women's Hall of Fame
 Okaloosa County Women's Hall of Fame
 San Diego County Women's Hall of Fame

Halls of fame by topic

Women in Aviation, International Pioneer Hall of Fame
International Women's Boxing Hall of Fame
National Cowgirl Museum and Hall of Fame
List of Women in Technology International Hall of Fame inductees
Women's Basketball Hall of Fame